Jaja may refer to:
 Jaja, Isfahan
 Jaja, Tiran and Karvan, Isfahan Province